(stylized 0verflow)  is a Japanese video game division of  specializing in the production of mature interactive fiction.<ref name="annlast">{{cite news|title=School Days''' Overflow Confirms It Is Making Its Last Title|url=http://www.animenewsnetwork.com/news/2012-02-10/school-days-overflow-confirms-it-is-making-its-last-title|date=February 10, 2012|publisher=Anime News Network|access-date=November 30, 2012}}</ref> The Overflow label is known for its game franchise School Days.

Overflow's PureMail video game was adapted into a two-episode OAV in 2001.

Overflow's Imouto de Ikou! video game was adapted into a two-episode OVA in 2003.

Overflow's School Days video game was adapted into a 12-episode anime series in 2007. Both School Days and Cross Days have also received manga adaptations.

Stack's Welcome to Pia Carrot!! video game series was adapted into a three-episode hentai OVA from 1997 to 1998. Its sequel, Welcome to Pia Carrot!! 2 was adapted into a three-episode hentai OVA from 1998 to 1999, and a six-episode OVA titled Welcome to the Pia Carrot!! 2 DX from 1999 to 2000. The video game also received an anime film titled Welcome to Pia Carrot!! -Sayaka no Koi-monogatari- in 2002.

On February 10, 2012, 0verflow confirmed that Shiny Days, a remake of Summer Days, would be the last title produced by the brand. Customers were told that the company would continue to support their line of video games.

Games
 Overflow
Overflow produced such games as:
 November 26, 1999: 
 August 25, 2000: PureMail April 27, 2001: 
 December 28, 2001: 
 December 27, 2002: 
 August 13, 2003: 
 December 27, 2003: 
 April 30, 2004: MISS EACH OTHER October 15, 2004: LOST M April 28, 2005: 
 January 27, 2006: 
 June 23, 2006: 
 March 19, 2010: 
 October 8, 2010: 
 April 27, 2012: 
 July 3, 2014: 
 April 28, 2016: 
 TearMail (cancelled)
Stack
Stack was involved in games such as:
 July 26, 1996: Welcome to Pia Carrot (MS-DOS)
 October 18, 1996: Welcome to Pia Carrot!! (Windows)
 May 23, 1997: Welcome to Pia Carrot!! (PC-FX)
 October 31, 1997: Welcome to Pia Carrot!! 2 (Windows 95)
 March 12, 1998: Welcome to Pia Carrot!! (Sega Saturn)
 October 8, 1998: Welcome to Pia Carrot!! (Sega Saturn)
 December 2, 2000: Welcome to Pia Carrot!! 2.2 (Game Boy Color)
 June 21, 2001: Welcome to Pia Carrot!! 2.5 (Dreamcast)
 October 26, 2001: Welcome to Pia Carrot!! 2 (Windows Me/2000)
 November 30, 2001: Welcome to Pia Carrot!! 3 (Windows 95/98/Me/2000)
 February 6, 2003: Welcome to Pia Carrot!! 2 (Dreamcast)
 March 27, 2003: Welcome to Pia Carrot!! 3 (Dreamcast), (PlayStation 2)
 April 23, 2004: Welcome to Pia Carrot!! 3 (Game Boy Advance)
 2006: Welcome to Pia Carrot!! G.O. ~Grand Open~ 2006: Pia Carrot G.O. TOYBOX ~Summer Fair~ 2007: MahJong in Pia Carrot~ 2008: Welcome to Pia Carrot!! G.P. 2009: Welcome to Pia Carrot!! 4 2010: Pia Carrot 4 FD 2014: PriPia ~Prince Pia Carrot~''

References

External links 

  

Hentai companies
Video game companies established in 1992
Japanese companies established in 1992
Software companies based in Tokyo
Video game companies of Japan
Video game publishing brands
Eroge
Mass media in Tokyo
Video game development companies
Video game publishers
Video game companies disestablished in 2012
Japanese companies disestablished in 2012